Maison Pic is a top five star hotel and restaurant located in Valence, Drôme, France. Established in 1889 by Eugene and Sophie Pic, the restaurant first earned the prestigious 3 Michelin stars in 1939 under their son André Pic (1893–1984). It lost its third star in 1946, and its second star in 1950. André's son Jacques Pic, who initially did not want to become a chef, decided to train as a chef in order to eventually take over from his father with the goal of regaining the stars. Under Jacques, the restaurant won back its second star in 1959 and its third in 1973. It kept the rating until 1995, three years after Jacques' death, after which it lost its third star. In 1997, Jacques' daughter Anne-Sophie Pic took over the restaurant from her brother Alain Pic, and it regained its third star in 2007. Pic is the only female chef in France to hold three Michelin stars.

The chefs of the Pic provided for the "Culinary Master Series 2005". The restaurant has a display of every edition of the Michelin Guide since 1933.

See also
List of Michelin starred restaurants

References

External links
Official site

Michelin Guide starred restaurants in France
Hotels established in 1889
Restaurants established in 1889
Buildings and structures in Drôme
Hotels in France
Valence, Drôme
1889 establishments in France
Pic family